The Rotunda Hospital (legally the Hospital for the Relief of Poor Lying-in Women, Dublin) is a maternity hospital on Parnell Street in Dublin, Ireland, now managed by RCSI Hospitals. The Rotunda entertainment buildings in Parnell Square are no longer part of the hospital complex.

History

The hospital was founded by Bartholomew Mosse, a surgeon and midwife who was appalled at the conditions that pregnant women had to endure, in George's Lane in March 1745. It was granted by Royal Charter on 2 December 1756 by King George II. Lying-in is an archaic term for childbirth (referring to the month-long bed rest prescribed for postpartum confinement). The venture was very successful and Mosse raised money through concerts, exhibitions and even a lottery to establish larger premises. The hospital moved to new premises, designed by Richard Cassels, where it became known as "The New Lying-In Hospital" in December 1757. The Church of Ireland Chapel was opened in 1762. Open to the public, it provided a healthy income to the hospital annually, Dr. Mosse successfully encouraging wealthy Protestant Dubliners to attend service there.

Records indicate that around 1781, "when the hospital was imperfectly ventilated, every sixth child died within nine days after birth, of convulsive disease; and that after means of thorough ventilation had been adopted, the mortality of infants, within the same, in five succeeding years, was reduced to one in twenty". This issue was not limited to the Lying-In-Hospital. In that era, ventilation improvement was a general issue in patient care, along with other issues of sanitation and hygiene, and the conditions in which surgeons such as Robert Liston in Britain and elsewhere, had to operate. Florence Nightingale famously worked on the design of safe and healthy hospitals.

The first caesarean section in Ireland was undertaken at the hospital in 1889.

Rotunda
The eponymous Rotunda is a rotunda designed by James Ensor, which was completed just in time for a reception hosted by the James FitzGerald, Marquess of Kildare in October 1767. The extensive Rotunda Rooms, designed by Richard Johnston and built adjacent to the rotunda, were completed in 1791.  By the early 19th century the hospital had become known as the Rotunda Hospital, after its most prominent architectural feature. The Rotunda became a theatre, where the Irish Volunteers' first public meeting was held in 1913, and later the Ambassador Cinema. The Rotunda Rooms now house the Gate Theatre.

Services
The Rotunda Hospital, as both a maternity hospital and also as a training centre (affiliated with Trinity College Dublin) is notable for having provided continuous service to mothers and babies since inception, making it the oldest continuously operating maternity hospital in the world. It is estimated that over 300,000 babies have been born there.

Criticism
In 2000 the Rotunda was one of two Dublin maternity hospitals found to have illegally retained organ tissue from babies without parental consent. The tissue removed in postmortem examinations was retained for some years. The Rotunda hospital admitted that that permission should have been sought for this process to be allowed to take place.

A medical negligence award was approved in 2020 for a young boy who developed cerebral palsy as a result of complications with his delivery at the hospital in 2004.

See also
General Lying-In Hospital, London

References

Sources

External links

1745 establishments in Ireland
Teaching hospitals in Dublin (city)
Teaching hospitals of the Royal College of Surgeons in Ireland
Teaching hospitals of the University of Dublin, Trinity College
Rotundas in Europe
Hospitals established in the 1740s
Parnell Square
 
Health Service Executive hospitals
Richard Cassels buildings
Maternity hospitals